André Robert Raimbourg (27 July 1917 – 23 September 1970), better known as André Bourvil, and mononymously as Bourvil, was a French actor and singer best known for his roles in comedy films, most notably in his collaboration with Louis de Funès in the films Le Corniaud (1965) and La Grande Vadrouille (1966). For his performance in Le Corniaud, he won a Special Diploma at the 4th Moscow International Film Festival.

Biography
His father was killed in the First World War before Bourvil was born. As a result, he spent his entire childhood in the village of Bourville, from which he took his stage name. He married Jeanne Lefrique on 23 January 1943. After a battle with Kahler's syndrome, which attacks the bone marrow, he died at the age of 53. He is buried in Montainville, Yvelines.

Career
In his comic performances Bourvil principally played roles of gentle and well-meaning characters who were often a bit obtuse or naïve, such as his roles opposite the hyperactive, dishonest and bossy ones played by Louis de Funès. Bourvil's characters not only managed to make viewers laugh, but also to save themselves, often unwittingly, from the Machiavellian designs of his adversaries.

Bourvil was, however, also capable of more dramatic roles such as the handyman in L'Arbre de Noël (1969). In this role he observes the relationship between a man he works for and the young son who has fallen ill. The audience can identify with the character played by Bourvil, just as they can in his comic roles, so often as a simple man. One can also note his role of Monsieur Thénardier in the film adaptation of Les Misérables (1958), and his penultimate role as the policeman Mattei in Jean-Pierre Melville's Le Cercle rouge (1970).

In March 1948, Bourvil took part in the complete recording of Offenbach's The Tales of Hoffmann with artists of the Paris Opéra-Comique conducted by André Cluytens, playing the four 'servant' roles.

Filmography

1942: Croisières sidérales as Extra (uncredited)
1943: Une étoile au soleil
1945: La Ferme du pendu as Saddler
1946: Not So Stupid as Léon Ménard
1947: Le Studio en folie as himself
1947: Par la fenêtre as Pilou
1947: Blanc comme neige as Léon Ménard
1948: The Heart on the Sleeve as Léon Ménard
1949: Le Roi Pandore as Léon Ménard
1950: Miquette as Urbain de la Tour-Mirande
1950: The Prize as Isidore Pastouret
1951: Mr. Peek-a-Boo as Léon Dutilleul
1951: Alone in Paris as Henri Milliard
1952: Crazy for Love as Hippolyte Lemoine
1953: A Hundred Francs a Second as himself
1953: The Three Musketeers as Planchet
1954: Royal Affairs in Versailles (directed by Sacha Guitry) as Versailles Museum Guide
1954: Poisson d'avril as Émile Dupuy
1954: Cadet Rousselle as Jérôme Baguindet
1954: Le Fil à la patte as Bouzin
1955: Les Hussards as Flicot 
1956: La Traversée de Paris as Marcel Martin
1956: The Singer from Mexico as Bilou
1958: Les Misérables (directed by Jean-Paul Le Chanois) as Thénardier
1958: Le Miroir à deux faces as Pierre Tardivet
1958: Un drôle de dimanche as Jean Brévent
1958:  as Me Jérôme Quilleboeuf
1959: Le chemin des écoliers as Charles Michaud
1959: The Green Mare (La Jument verte) as Honoré Haudouin
1959: Le Bossu as Passepoil
1960: Le Capitan as Cogolin
1960: Fortunat as Noël Fortunat
1961: Dans la gueule du loup as Drugged Man
1961: All the Gold in the World as Dumont and his sons: Mathieu, 'Toine, Martial
1961: Le Tracassin ou les plaisirs de la ville ("The Busybody", Alex Joffé) as André Loriot
1962: The Longest Day as Alphonse Lenaux, Mayor of Colleville-sur-Orne
1962: Tartarin de Tarascon as Priest
1962: Un clair de lune à Maubeuge as Television Singer
1962: Les Culottes rouges as Fendard
1963: Les Bonnes Causes as Albert Gaudet
1963: Un drôle de paroissien as Georges Lachaunaye
1963: Le Magot de Josepha as Pierre Corneille
1963:  as André Colombey 
1964: La Grande Frousse as Inspector Simon Triquet
1965: Le Corniaud (The Sucker) (directed by Gérard Oury) as Antoine Maréchal
1965: Le Majordome as True Groom (uncredited)
1965: Guerre secrète as Lalande
1965: La Grosse Caisse as Louis Bourdin
1965: The Wise Guys as Hector Valentin
1966: Trois enfants dans le désordre as Eugène Laporte
1966: La Grande Vadrouille (directed by Gérard Oury) as Augustin Bouvet
1967: Les Arnaud as Le juge Henri Arnaud
1968: Les Cracks as Jules Auguste Duroc
1968: La Grande Lessive as Armand Saint-Just
1969: Le Cerveau (directed by Gérard Oury) as Anatole
1969: Monte Carlo or Bust (Gonflés à bloc) (directed by Ken Annakin) as Monsieur Dupont
1969: The Christmas Tree (L'Arbre de Noël), (directed by Terence Young) as Verdun
1970: L'Étalon (directed by Jean-Pierre Mocky) as William Chaminade
1970: Le Mur de l'Atlantique (Atlantic Wall) directed by Marcel Camus as Léon Duchemin
1970: Le Cercle rouge directed by Jean-Pierre Melville as Le Commissaire Mattei 
1971: Clodo as Gaston (final film role)

Songs
Nearly 300, among which the best known are:
 "La tendresse"
 "Salade de fruits"
 "Les crayons"
 "La Tactique du gendarme" (from the film Le roi Pandore)
 "Ballade irlandaise"
 "Un clair de lune à Maubeuge"
 "Petit bal perdu" (C'était bien)
 "Ma p'tite chanson"

References

External links

French links
Biography Site 
Bourvil on Encinematheque

1917 births
1970 deaths
Deaths from multiple myeloma
People from Seine-Maritime
Volpi Cup for Best Actor winners
French comedians
French comedy musicians
French male film actors
French male stage actors
French male radio actors
20th-century French male actors
Légion d'honneur refusals
20th-century French comedians
20th-century French male singers
Deaths from cancer in France